Kirk Daubenspeck (born July 21, 1974) is an American retired ice hockey goaltender who was an All-American for Wisconsin.

Career
Daubenspeck was drafted by the Philadelphia Flyers in 1992 straight out of Culver Military Academy. He spent the following season playing in the USHL before beginning his college career with the Wisconsin Badgers. After playing just seven games in his freshman season, Daubenspeck's rights were traded along with Claude Boivin to the Ottawa Senators for Mark Lamb. Entering his sophomore season, Daubenspeck got into a competition to replace the departed Jim Carey as the Badger's primary starter. He won the job and remained as Wisconsin's top goalie for the rest of his time in Madison. In his first year as the starter, Daubenspeck won 23 games and helped Wisconsin win the WCHA championship for which he was named tournament MVP. Wisconsin declined after 1995 and fell in the standings. Despite the decline, Daubenspeck remained respected and was named an All-American in 1997 even though he possessed a losing record and less-than-stellar numbers.

After graduating, Daubenspeck signed a rookie contract with Ottawa and participated in their training camp that September. Just before the season began, he was traded to the Chicago Blackhawks for a 6th round draft pick. Daubenspeck began the year as a backup behind Jeff Hackett. He remained with the team for the first month of the season, not seeing any game action, and was then sent down to the Indianapolis Ice. He played a few games at the IHL level before ending up with the Jacksonville Lizard Kings. Daubenspeck spent most of the rest of his career playing AA hockey, making brief appearances with several AHL teams over a nine year span. In 2001, Daubenspeck helped the South Carolina Stingrays win the Kelly Cup, playing in 13 of the team's 18 playoff games. He retired as a player in 2006.

Accident
On February 17, 2011, Daubenspeck was involved in a car accident on Route 18. While driving in heavy fog near Dodgeville, Wisconsin, Daubenspeck's car ran into a Semi-trailer truck. He suffered a severe brain injury and was in a coma for six days. While to took several months, Daubenspeck did eventually recover from the crash. A year to the day after the accident, he dropped the ceremonial puck before a game between Wisconsin and Denver.

Statistics

Regular season and playoffs

Awards and honors

References

External links

1974 births
Living people
AHCA Division I men's ice hockey All-Americans
American men's ice hockey goaltenders
Ice hockey people from Wisconsin
Sportspeople from Madison, Wisconsin
Wisconsin Badgers men's ice hockey players
Indianapolis Ice players
Jacksonville Lizard Kings players
Chesapeake Icebreakers players
Rochester Americans players
South Carolina Stingrays players
Orlando Solar Bears (IHL) players
Colorado Gold Kings players
Worcester IceCats players
Portland Pirates players
Hershey Bears players
Philadelphia Flyers draft picks